Netflix is an American over-the-top content platform and production company, since 2013 several programs from the platform have been nominated and won both Primetime Emmy Awards and Primetime Creative Arts Emmy Awards, the latter being a part of the former focused on recognizing technical and other similar achievements in American television programming.

The following list focuses only on the categories that are usually included in the Creative Arts ceremony, the ones that are presented on the main ceremony are already covered here.

Programs
Queer Eye has won Outstanding Structured Reality Program five consecutive times (2018–2022). Tidying Up with Marie Kondo scored a nomination in 2019 while Love Is Blind was nominated in 2020.

Somebody Feed Phil was nominated for its second season in 2019 while Cheer and Kevin Hart: Don't F**k This Up were nominated in 2020 with the former winning.

Five documentaries from Netflix have been nominated for Exceptional Merit in Documentary Filmmaking  with Strong Island winning in 2018.

My Next Guest Needs No Introduction with David Letterman was nominated for its first two seasons while Comedians in Cars Getting Coffee received nominations for seasons ten and eleven.

Out of the last five years, Netflix has won three times for Outstanding Documentary or Nonfiction Series; Making a Murderer (2016), Wild Wild Country (2018), and Our Planet (2019). Chef's Table was nominated for seasons two, three, and five while The Keepers and Tiger King: Murder, Mayhem, and Madness were also nominated.

In 2014, The Square was the first Netflix documentary to be nominated for Outstanding Documentary or Nonfiction Special. In 2015, Virunga scored a nomination while What Happened, Miss Simone? was the first documentary film to win in 2016. In 2017, Amanda Knox was nominated; 13th won the award. In 2018, Icarus and Jim & Andy: The Great Beyond were nominated. The following year, Fyre: The Greatest Party That Never Happened was nominated. The most recent documentary films to be nominated for the award are Becoming and The Great Hack.

In 2017, Netflix debuted in the category with the specials Louis C.K. 2017 and Sarah Silverman: A Speck of Dust. The following year, Steve Martin & Martin Short: An Evening You Will Forget for the Rest of Your Life was nominated while Dave Chappelle: Equanimity won. In 2019, the streaming service scored four nominations in the category; Hannah Gadsby: Nanette, Homecoming: A Film by Beyoncé, Springsteen on Broadway, and Wanda Sykes: Not Normal. In 2020, out of five nominated specials, Dave Chappelle: Sticks & Stones won.

Both Big Mouth and BoJack Horseman have been nominated twice for Outstanding Animated Program in 2019 and 2020.

In 2019, Love, Death & Robots won Outstanding Short Form Animated Program.

Jim Henson's The Dark Crystal: Age of Resistance won Outstanding Children's Program in 2020.	

In 2019, It's Bruno! and Special were nominated.

In 2020, Between Two Ferns with Zach Galifianakis: The Movie, Sorta Uncut Interviews was nominated.

Acting

Guest Actor
In 2014, Reg E. Cathey was nominated for House of Cards. The following year, he won in the category for the same role. For season two of Orange Is the New Black, Pablo Schreiber, received the only nomination for the series in the guest actor category. House of Cards continued to dominate the guest acting field adding Mahershala Ali and Paul Sparks. After winning an Emmy for Outstanding Supporting Actor in a Drama Series for Bloodline, Ben Mendelsohn was nominated in the guest category for the final season of the series. In 2018, Cameron Britton, from Mindhunter, and Matthew Goode, from The Crown, were nominated.

Netflix's only nomination for Outstanding Guest Actor in a Comedy Series was in 2015 for Jon Hamm in Unbreakable Kimmy Schmidt.

Guest Actress
House of Cards is the Netflix original with the most nominations in the category with four; Kate Mara in 2014, Rachel Brosnahan in 2015, and Ellen Burstyn and Molly Parker in 2016. In 2017, Shannon Purser received a nomination for Stranger Things. For Orange Is the New Black, Laverne Cox was nominated in 2017, 2018, and 2020.

In 2014, Orange Is the New Blacks Uzo Aduba won her first Emmy for playing Suzanne "Crazy Eyes" Warren for the first season while Natasha Lyonne and Laverne Cox were also nominated for the same season; Cox became the first transgender woman to be nominated for an Emmy Award. The following year, Tina Fey was nominated for her guest role in Unbreakable Kimmy Schmidt while Angela Bassett was nominated for her performance in Master of None in 2017.

Short Form
In 2019, sixth-place finisher Ryan O'Connell became the fifth nominee in the category after Jonathan Banks' nomination was revoked. It was determined that several episodes were shorter than two minutes, violating the Academy of Television Arts & Sciences' rule that six episodes air during the eligibility period with a runtime of at least two minutes.

In 2019, Special scored two nominations in the category with actresses Jessica Hecht and Punam Patel, for the first season of the series.

Voice-Over Performance and Narrator
In 2020, Maya Rudolph won for her role at Connie the Hormone Monstress in Big Mouth.

Both Meryl Streep and David Attenborough have won Outstanding Narrator, the former for Five Came Back in 2017 and the latter for Our Planet in 2019.

Individual Achievement in Animation
In 2019, Carmen Sandiego and Love, Death & Robots won the Outstanding Individual Achievement in Animation, with the latter winning four times for three different episodes.

Casting
In 2013, Laray Mayfield and Julie Schubert, from House of Cards, won for the first season of the series. The series was also nominated for seasons two, three, and four. In 2015 and 2016, Orange Is the New Black was nominated. Tara Feldstein Bennett, Carmen Cuba and Chase Paris, from Stranger Things, won the award in 2017. The Crown was nominated for its first three seasons, winning in 2018. In 2019 and 2020, Ozark was nominated for its second and third seasons.

In 2014, Jennifer Euston won for the first season of Orange Is the New Black. A year later, the series was moved to the drama categories. Unbreakable Kimmy Schmidt was nominated two times for the award, in 2015 and 2016, while GLOW and Russian Doll were each nominated for their debut seasons; Dead to Me and Master of None were each nominated for their sophomore seasons.

The limited series When They See Us won in 2019, while Godless was nominated in 2018.

Queer Eye has won two out of three nominations, winning consecutively in 2018 and 2019.

Cinematography

The Ranch won the award for seasons one, three and four, and nominated for season two. Donald A. Morgan is the cinematographer nominated for each season.

In 2018, The End of the F***ing World and GLOW were nominated; the former received a second nomination in 2020. Russian Dolls Chris Teague won for his work on the episode "Ariadne" in 2019.

House of Cards won for Outstanding Cinematography for a Single-Camera Series (One Hour) in 2013. The series was also nominated for seasons two, three, and four. In 2017, The Crown, Sense8 and Stranger Things were each nominated for the award. In 2018, Adriano Goldman, from The Crown, won for his work on the episode "Beryl"; Goldman was also nominated in 2017 and 2020. Meanwhile, Ben Kutchins was nominated twice for Ozark in 2018 and 2020.

Black Mirror was nominated for the episodes "Nosedive" and "USS Callister". Godless scored a nomination in the category for "An Incident at Creede". In 2019, When They See Us was nominated for the episode "Part 1" by cinematographer Bradford Young.

For his work in Queer Eye, Garrett Rose has been nominated three times, in 2018, 2019 and 2020.

In 2015, Franklin Down won for his work in Virunga. The series Chef's Table has received two consecutive nominations in 2017 and 2018 while Our Planet was nominated for three different episodes in 2019.

Costumes
The comedy series Grace and Frankie has received five consecutive nominations (2016-2020). In 2019, Jennifer Rogien, Charlotte Svenson, Melissa Stanton won for their work in the episode "Superiority Complex" from Russian Doll.

The A Series of Unfortunate Events has been nominated twice, in 2018 and 2019.

The period drama The Crown has won thrice, in 2017, 2018 and 2020.

In 2019, the concert film Homecoming: A Film by Beyoncé received a nomination.

Directing
Out of the several programs nominated, three have won for Outstanding Directing for a Documentary/Nonfiction Program, Jehane Noujaim for The Square in 2014, Moira Demos and Laura Ricciardi for Making a Murderer in 2016 and Steven Bognar and Julia Reichert for American Factory in 2020.

In 2020, Linda Mendoza received a nomination for directing the episode "Flame Monroe" from Tiffany Haddish Presents: They Ready.

Two Netflix specials have won in this category, Thom Zimny for Springsteen on Broadway in 2019 and Stan Lathan for Dave Chappelle: Sticks & Stones in 2020.

For his directing in Queer Eye, Hisham Abed was nominated in 2019 and 2020, winning the former, while in 2020, Greg Whiteley won for directing the episode "Daytona" from Cheer.

Hairstyling
Until 2019, hairstyling categories for series were split in Outstanding Hairstyling for a Single-Camera Series and Outstanding Hairstyling for a Limited Series or Series, series like The Crown and GLOW received two nomination for the single-camera category while the miniseries Godless was nominated for the limited series/movie one.

In 2020, the previous categories for hairstyling for series were divided in Outstanding Contemporary Hairstyling and Outstanding Period and/or Character Hairstyling.

Hosting

In 2019, Marie Kondo was nominated for hosting Tidying Up with Marie Kondo while in 2020, Nicole Byer and the Fav Five (Bobby Berk, Karamo Brown, Tan France, Antoni Porowski and Jonathan Van Ness) were nominated for Nailed It! and Queer Eye respectively.

Interactive Media
Several series have received nominations for their interactive media, Stranger Things was nominated twice, for Stranger Things VR Experience in 2017 and for Stranger Things: Scoops Ahoy: Operation Scoop Snoop in 2020. In 2019, Black Mirror won for their interactive episode Bandersnatch and in 2020, Big Mouth won for Big Mouth Guide to Life.

Main Title Design
Since 2015, every year at least one series receives a nomination for their opening title cards, in total, 10 series have been nominated with Stranger Things winning in 2017.

Make-Up
Until 2019, non-prosthetic makeup categories were divided in Outstanding Makeup for a Single-Camera Series (Non-Prosthetic) and Outstanding Makeup for a Limited Series or Movie (Non-Prosthetic). Comedy series GLOW received two nominations in the single-camera category, in 2018 and 2019.

In 2020, the previous categories for non-prosthetic makeup were divided in Outstanding Contemporary Makeup (Non-Prosthetic) and Outstanding Period and/or Character Makeup (Non-Prosthetic).

Motion design

Music
Composer Jeff Beal received five nominations for House of Cards, winning twice, in 2015 and 2017.

Limited series like Godless, When They See Us and Unorthodox have received nominations for their music.

For scoring the documentary Becoming, Kamasi Washington received nominations for Outstanding Music Composition for a Documentary Series or Special and for the Grammy Award for Best Score Soundtrack for Visual Media.

Four series have won Outstanding Original Main Title Theme Music, Marvel's Jessica Jones, Stranger Things, Godless and Hollywood.

Paul Shaffer was nominated in 2016 for A Very Murray Christmas.

For her work in Stranger Things, Nora Felder was nominated three times, in 2017, 2018 and 2020.

American rapper Common, Robert Glasper and Karriem Riggins won for their song "Letter to the Free" for the documentary 13th.

Picture Editing
Pat Barnett received three nominations for One Day at a Time, winning in 2019.

Stranger Things has received four nominations, winning in 2017 for the episode "Chapter One: The Vanishing of Will Byers".

Orange Is the New Black received three nominations in 2014 winning once. 

Selina MacArthur won in 2018 for the episode "USS Callister" from Black Mirror.

For his work in two Dave Chappelle variety specials, Jeff U'ren has been nominated twice, in 2018 and 2020.

Moira Demos won in 2016 for the episode "Indefensible" from Making a Murderer.

Queer Eye has won two out of three nominations.

The editing team from Cheer won in 2020 for the episode "God Blessed Texas".

Production Design
House of Cards received three consecutive nominations from 2014 to 2016 when contemporary and fantasy series where awarded within the same category. In 2018, fantasy series were paired with the period ones to be rewarded in a category separated from contemporary programs. Ozark has been nominated three years in a row, from 2018 to 2020.

Sound

Editing

Mixing

Special Visual Effects

Stunt Coordination

Technical Direction

Writing
In 2016, Making a Murderer won for Outstanding Writing for a Nonfiction Programming for its first season. 13th, written by Ava DuVernay and Spencer Averick, won in 2017; Amanda Knox and Bill Nye Saves the World were also nominated. The following year, Icarus scored a nomination while the series Our Planet was nominated in 2019. In 2020, Don't F**k with Cats: Hunting an Internet Killer won; Circus of Books was also nominated.

In 2016, Patton Oswalt won for his special Patton Oswalt: Talking for Clapping, meanwhile John Mulaney was nominated for John Mulaney: The Comeback Kid. In 2017, Louis C.K. and Sarah Silverman were nominated for their own individual specials. In 2018, John Mulaney won for his special John Mulaney: Kid Gorgeous at Radio City; Patton Oswalt: Annihilation (by Patton Oswalt) and Steve Martin & Martin Short: An Evening You Will Forget for the Rest of Your Life (by Steve Martin and Martin Short) were also nominated. In 2019 and 2020, out of five nominated Netflix specials, Hannah Gadsby and Dave Chappelle won for writing their respective specials.

See also
 List of accolades received by Netflix
 List of Primetime Emmy Awards received by Netflix

References

Lists of accolades received by Netflix
Primetime Emmy Award winners